The University of Haifa ( Arabic: جامعة حيفا) is a university located on Mount Carmel in Haifa, Israel. Founded in 1963, the University of Haifa received full academic accreditation in 1972, becoming Israel's sixth academic institution and the fourth university. The university has the largest university library in Israel. As of 2019, approximately 18,000 students were enrolled at the University of Haifa. Among Israeli higher education institutions the University of Haifa has the largest percentage (41%) of Arab-Israeli students.

Overview
The University of Haifa was founded in 1963 by Haifa mayor Abba Hushi, to operate under the academic auspices of the Hebrew University of Jerusalem. Haifa University is located on Mount Carmel. In 1972, the University of Haifa declared its independence and became the sixth academic institution in Israel and the fourth university.

About 18,100 undergraduate and graduate students study in the university a wide variety of topics, specializing in social sciences, humanities, law and education. The university is broadly divided into six Faculties: Humanities, Social Sciences, Law, Science and Science Education, Social Welfare and Health Studies, and Education. There is also the Graduate School of Management, The Leon H. Charney School of Marine Sciences and the Continuing Education and Extension Studies, as well as an international school offering courses in English.

Beyond the objective of a first-rate higher education, the University of Haifa aims to provide equal educational opportunities to all, and in particular to encourage mutual understanding and cooperation between the Jewish and Arab populations on and off campus. The university is a home for students from all sectors of Israeli society - Jews, Muslims, Christians, Druze, religious and secular students and also many students from all over the world who study in the international school.

The University of Haifa is home to the Hecht Museum of archaeology and art, several research centers and institutes, including the Evolution Institute, Center for the Study of the Information Society, Center for the Study of National Security, Tourism Research Center, and more. The university also hosts a large IBM research center on its campus.

Research centers
Examples of the university research centers:
The Institute of Evolution
The Center for Cyber, Law and Policy
Theoretical Physics and Astrophysics Center
The Integrated Brain and Behavior Research Center (IBBR)
The Institute of Information Processing and Decision Making
The Max Wertheimer Minerva Center for Cognitive Processes
Haifa Interdisciplinary Center for Advanced Computer Science
The National Security Studies Center
The Edmond J. Safra Brain Research Center for the Study of Learning Disabilities
Center for Spatial Information Systems Research (CSISR)
Maritime Policy & Strategy Research Center
 The Haifa Center for German European Studies
 The Weiss-Livnat International Center for Holocaust Research and Education

International MA programs 
 Child Development
 Diplomacy Studies
 Modern German and European Studies
 MBA in Sustainability
 Public Health (MPH)
 Holocaust Studies
 Israel Studies
 Jewish Studies
 Maritime Civilizations
 National Security Studies
 Peace and Conflict Management
 Archaeology
 Public Management and Policy (MPA)
 International Relations
 Marine Geosciences (MSc.)
 International MBA
 Statistics
 Marine Biology (MSc.)

Zinman Institute of Archaeology
The Zinman Institute of Archaeology is a research institute under Haifa's Faculty of Humanities. It was founded in 1988 with a donation from Betty and Philip Zinman and specializes in the archaeology of northern Israel, especially the area around Mount Carmel.

Academic journals
Mishpat U’Memshal (Law and Government) – Founded in 1992, the journal deals with current and relevant public law issues. The publishing team is mainly composed of students under the academic supervision of a senior editor appointed by the Faculty of Law.

Hearot Din (Illuminating the Law) – Founded in 2004, the journal deals with changes in legal rulings in Israel. The publishing team is mainly composed of students under the academic supervision of a senior editor appointed by the Faculty of Law.

Din U’Devarim (Haifa Law Review) – Founded in 2005, the journal focuses on the interaction between the law and other fields of knowledge, especially the humanities and social sciences, but also serves as a platform for traditional legal writing. Faculty members produce the articles with the assistance of outstanding students at the Faculty of Law.

The Journal of Holocaust Research—formerly Dapim: Studies on the Holocaust (2009–2018)—is a bilingual (Hebrew and English) academic journal produced by the University of Haifa and the Ghetto Fighters' House and published by Routledge. It is available online and in print.

Michmanim – The Reuben and Edith Hecht Museum publishes a scholarly, dual language journal on archaeological research and artifacts in the museum's collections.

Leadership
University President – Professor Ron Robin
University Rector – Professor Gur Alroey
President, Board of Governors – Bradley Bloom

Notable alumni

Notable academics

See also
 List of universities in Israel
 Bucerius Institute for Research of Contemporary German History and Society

References

Further reading

External links

The University of Haifa homepage
The official Website of University of Haifa International School
The research portal of University of Haifa
University of Haifa Archive on the Digital collections of Younes and Soraya Nazarian Library, University of Haifa

 
Buildings and structures in Haifa
Education in Haifa
Law schools in Israel
Research institutes in Israel
Universities in Israel
Oscar Niemeyer buildings
1963 establishments in Israel
Educational institutions established in 1963